Churchlands is a Legislative Assembly electorate in the state of Western Australia. Churchlands is named for the western suburb of Churchlands, which falls within its borders, and was created at the 1994 redistribution, replacing the seat of Floreat which had existed since 1968.

It was held for most of its history by Liz Constable, the independent former member for Floreat who had won the predecessor seat in a 1991 by-election.  However, the seat's demographics suggested it was a strongly Liberal seat on paper, and it was taken for granted Constable would be succeeded by a Liberal once she retired. Constable retired at the 2013 election, and was succeeded as expected by Liberal Sean L'Estrange. L'Estrange held the seat until his unexpected defeat by Christine Tonkin in 2021.

Demographics
Churchlands and the neighbouring electorates of Nedlands to the southeast and Cottesloe to the southwest comprise the affluent western suburbs of Perth—the Australian Bureau of Statistics's SEIFA index (2001) ranked them as the highest three electorates by socio-economic status in Western Australia, with high scores on educational and employment opportunity. At the 2006 census, the median individual income in the Churchlands electorate, based on its 2005 boundaries, was $607 per week compared to $513 in the Perth metropolitan area, and the median weekly household income was $1,115 compared to $1,086 across Perth. 45.4% of the population were professionals or managers.

All three seats were considered comfortably safe Liberal seats, until the 2021 state election, and they are almost entirely within the federal seat of Curtin, which was safe Liberal as well until teal independent Kate Chaney won it in 2022.

Members for Churchlands

Election results

References

External links
 Electorate profile (Antony Green, ABC)

Churchlands